Telgaon is a small village in Ahmedpur subdivision of Latur district in the Indian state of Maharashtra.

Telgaon, Dist: Latur, Maharashtra Population Approx. 1500–2000. 
This town is located on the Maharashtra State highway no. 3 (Kolhapur-Nagpur Highway).  It is a small town where majority of population's occupation is farming and milk production. It has a dam, The crops taken in the tehsil are jowar, red gram, soybean, sugarcane, etc.  Many farmers have started getting income out of fruits like Mangoes.

Villages in Latur district
Latur district
Villages in Ahmedpur taluka